Phra Phutthayotfa Chulalok Maharaj (20 March 1737 – 7 September 1809), personal name Thongduang, also known as Rama I, was the founder of the Rattanakosin Kingdom and the first monarch of the reigning Chakri dynasty of Siam (now Thailand). His full title in Thai is Phra Bat Somdet Phra Paramoruracha Mahachakkriborommanat Phra Phutthayotfa Chulalok. He ascended the throne in 1782, following the deposition of King Taksin of Thonburi. He was also celebrated as the founder of Rattanakosin (now Bangkok) as the new capital of the reunited kingdom. 

Rama I, whose given name was Thongduang, was born from a Mon male line descent family, great-grandson  of Kosa Pan. His father served in the royal court of the Ayutthaya Kingdom. Thongduang and his younger brother Boonma served King Taksin in wars against the Burmese Konbaung dynasty and helped him in the reunification of Siam. During this time he emerged as Siam's most powerful military leader. Thongduang was the first Somdet Chao Phraya, the highest rank the nobility could attain, equaled to that of royalty. In 1782, he took control of Siam and crowned himself as the monarch. The most famous event in his reign was the Burmese–Siamese War of 1785–86, which was the last major Burmese assault on Siam.

Name 
Like other high-ranking figures of old Siam, Rama I's name changed several times during his lifetime, depending on his respective position, and even posthumously. His name at birth was Thongduang (also spelled Thong Duang ทองด้วง), family names had not yet been introduced in Siam at that time.

When Thongduang served as deputy governor of Ratchaburi Province during the rule of King Ekkathat of Ayutthaya, he bore the title of Luang Yokkrabat. After the demise of Ayutthaya, the new king Taksin to whom he served as an important military commander, awarded him successively the titles of Phra Ratcharin Chao Krom Phra Tamruat (head of the police department), Phraya Aphaironnarit, Phraya Yommarat, Phraya Chakri and Chaophraya Chakri (minister of the northern provinces). Finally Taksin created him the title of Somdet Chaophraya Maha Kasatsuek, a noble title as high as no Siamese official had born before him, making him quasi-royalty.

When he ascended to the throne in 1782, he took the name Ramathibodi, just like the founder of the Ayutthaya Kingdom. His full title was much longer (Phra Borommarachathirat Ramathibodi Sisin Borommaha Chakkraphat Rachathibodin etc.), intended to demonstrate his universal claim to power like of earlier Siamese kings.

After his death, the people referred to him simply as Phaendin Ton ("the first reign"), to his son as Phaendin Klang ("the middle reign"). Continuing this system consequently, his grandson Rama III would have been "the last reign". To avoid this inauspicious title, he ended this practice by donating two Buddha statues that were placed to the sides of the Emerald Buddha at Wat Phra Kaeo and dedicated one each to his father and grandfather. He demanded to refer to his two predecessors using the names of these Buddha statues. The one dedicated to the first Chakri king was named Phra Phutthayotfa Chulalok ("the Buddha on top of the sky and the crown of the worlds"). This is how this king is still referred to in Thai history books.

His descendant Vajiravudh (Rama VI) who had studied in England, realised that most Siamese kings' names were difficult to reproduce and remember for Westerners. He therefore disposed to use for all kings of the Chakri dynasty the name Rama together with the respective ordinal number. So this king is Rama I in Western literature. In 1982, 200 years after his accession, the Thai cabinet decided to award him the epithet Maharat ("The Great").

Early life

An Ayuttayan aristocrat

Thongduang was born in 1737 in the reign of King Boromakot of Ayutthaya. His father was Thongdi, a Mon noble serving the royal court (posthumously raised to Somdet Phra Prathom Borommahachonnok – "the grand primordial father") who was Phra Akson Sunthonsat (Royal Secretary of northern Siam, Keeper of the Royal Seal). Phra Akson Sunthonsat was also a descendant of Kosa Pan, the leader of King Narai's embassy to the French court. His mother, Daoreung (original name Yok), was part-Chinese. Thongduang had six other siblings.

Thongduang at a young age entered the Royal Palace as one of the royal pages of King Uthumphon, where he met his childhood friend Taksin. In 1757, aged 21, he became a monk temporarily, in accordance with Siamese custom. In 1760, he married Nak, daughter of a town patron in Samut Sakorn. He was later appointed the Luang Yokkrabat (deputy governor) of Ratchaburi Province by King Ekkathat in 1758.

Service under Taksin
On the eve of the fall of Ayutthaya, Phraya Wachiraprakan (later King Taksin) had foreseen that the fall of the city was certain. Wachiraprakan decided to break the siege of the city of Ayutthaya by the Burmese army and establish a new base outside. Phraya Ratchaburi also joined this venture. In 1767, Ayutthaya under King Ekkathat fell to Burmese invaders, the city was completely destroyed; burned and looted. Local warlords rose up to establish their supremacy in the absence of a central authority.

Despite the fall of Ayutthaya, Taksin and his men in the same year managed to capture Chantaburi and Trat. During this time Phraya Ratchaburi became one of Taksin's six ministers and together with Phraya Pichai they were regarded by Taksin as his two most valuable generals.

Military leader
Swiftly Taksin made a strategic plan and under it recaptured Ayutthaya in one year. In 1768 Taksin crowned himself and founded the Kingdom of Thonburi on the west bank of the mouth of the Chao Phraya river, using Thonburi as a new capital. Under the new Thonburi regime, Thongduang was appointed head of the royal police department, bearing the title Phra Ratcharin. After subjugating the warlord of Phimai with his brother Bunma (at that time called Phra Mahamontri, the future Maha Sura Singhanat), he was raised to Phraya Aphairanarit.

After the campaign to subdue the lord of Fang in 1769, Thongduang was raised to Phraya Yommarat and in the next year became Chao Phraya Chakri – the Samuhanayok (chief minister of the northern provinces). Chakri commanded the Siamese troops in the wars against Burma and went on to subjugate Cambodia. His brother Bunma (who by that time held the title of Phraya Anuchit Raja), accompanied him in various campaigns. Chakri and his brother were sent to the north to Lan Na in 1774 to free the kingdom from Burmese rule with the help of Phraya Kawila, a prince from Lampang. In 1776, he conquered Khmer Pa Dong (around modern Surin). He was assigned the task of conquering Lao kingdoms in 1778 and all the three kingdoms (Vientiane, Luang Prabang, Champasak) fell to the Siamese in the same year. He was eventually raised to Somdet Chao Phraya Maha Kasatsuek, the first official to ever hold this rank.

Ascension as King

In 1781, he went on the campaigns against Cambodia, only to return prematurely due to the instability of Thonburi. The rebellion of Phraya Sun had broken out and the rebels deposed King Taksin. Some sources report that Taksin was consigned to a monastery. After arriving in Thonburi in 1782, Chao Phraya defeated the Phraya Sun with his forces. Later sources widely reported that the general eventually executed the ousted Taksin, contradicting to some earlier sources. He then seized power and made himself King, establishing the Chakri dynasty, which continues to rule Thailand to this day.

General Maha Kasatsuek crowned himself on 6 April 1782. Soon after, he decided to move the capital of Siam to the east bank of the Chao Phraya river for several reasons, including its better strategic location and a desire to promote his legitimacy by starting from a clean slate. He decided to name his new capital "Rattanakosin" ("Keeping place of the Emerald Buddha"). Rama I also raised various members of his family to royalty. He appointed his brother Surasi (Anuchit Raja) or Maha Sura Singhanat as the "Front Palace" (conventional title of the viceroy and heir apparent) and his nephew Thong-In or Anurak Devesh as the "Rear Palace".

The King had 42 children. Ten of these were born to Queen Amarinda, the others by various concubines. The Queen's children included Prince Isarasundhorn, later King Buddha Loetla Nabhalai (Rama II) (whom the King appointed as Front Palace after the death of Maha Sura Singhanat in 1803), Prince Maha Senanurak and Prince Maha Sakdi Polsep.

Foreign policy and war

Vietnam and Cambodia

In 1784–1785, the last of the Nguyễn Lords, Nguyễn Ánh, convinced Rama I to give him forces to attack Vietnam, which was then under the control of the Tây Sơn brothers. However, the joint Nguyễn-Siam fleet was destroyed in the Battle of Rach Gam–Xoai Mut in the Mekong Delta region. Nguyễn's appeal for Siamese assistance enabled the Siamese to exert considerable political influence over Nguyễn's court. Mac Tu Sinh, the son of Mạc Thiên Tứ and his Siamese wife, was raised among the Siamese, and held office as the governor of Hà Tiên until his death in 1787. Ngo Ma, a general of Siamese descent, was appointed as its acting governor in Mac's place. Nguyễn Ánh also took refuge in Siam at the King's court waiting for the opportunities to defeat Tây Sơn. These episodes demonstrated Rama I's willingness to extend Siamese power beyond his Kingdom.

In Cambodia, King Reamraja (Ang Non II) was deposed in 1779 and the throne was given to the young prince Ang Eng. However, the pro-Vietnamese policies of certain Cambodian aristocrats under Ang Eng alarmed Rama I. As a result, Rama I had Ang Eng captured and deported to Bangkok, where Rama adopted him as his son, the purpose of which was to impose pro-Siamese sentiments on him. Rama I also imposed Chao Phraya Abhaya Bhubet as the Regent of Cambodia.

Nguyễn Ánh secretly left for Vietnam in 1787, leaving Rama I a note. Nguyen managed to recapture Saigon by 1788 and later ascended as Emperor Gia Long in 1802.

In 1794, upon Ang Eng's majority, Rama I reinstalled him as the Neareay Reachea III. The area around Siemreap and Battambang was annexed by Siam, and were governed by Abhaya Bhubet. However, Rama I allowed these territories to be ruled in accordance with Cambodian traditions.

Wars with Burma

Soon King Bodawpaya of Burma started to pursue his ambitious campaigns to expand his dominions over Siam. The Burmese–Siamese War (1785–1786), also known in Siam as the "Nine Armies War" because the Burmese came in nine armies, broke out. The Burmese soldiers poured into Lanna and Northern Siam. Siamese forces, commanded by Kawila, Prince of Lampang, put up a brave fight and delayed the Burmese advance, all the while waiting for reinforcements from Bangkok. When Phitsanulok was captured, Anurak Devesh the Rear Palace, and Rama I himself led Siamese forces to the north. The Siamese relieved Lampang from the Burmese siege.

In the south, Bodawpaya was waiting at Chedi Sam Ong ready to attack. The Front Palace was ordered to lead his troops to the south and counter-attack the Burmese coming to Ranong through Nakhon Si Thammarat. He brought the Burmese to battle near Kanchanaburi. The Burmese also attacked Thalang (Phuket), where the governor had just died. Chan, his wife, and her sister Mook gathered the local people and successfully defended Thalang against the Burmese. Today, Chan and Mook are revered as heroines because of their opposition to the Burmese invasions. In their own lifetimes, Rama I bestowed on them the titles Thao Thep Kasattri and Thao Sri Sunthon.

The Burmese proceeded to capture Songkhla. Upon hearing the news, the governors of Phatthalung fled. However, a monk named Phra Maha encouraged the citizens of the area to take up arms against the Burmese; his campaign was also successful. Phra Maha was later raised to the nobility by Rama I.

As his armies were destroyed, Bodawpaya retreated. The next year, he attacked again, this time constituting his troops as a single army. With this force Bodawpaya passed through the Chedi Sam Ong pass and settled in Tha Din Daeng. The Front Palace marched the Siamese forces to face Bodawpaya. The fighting was very short and Bodawpaya was quickly defeated. This short war was called the Tha Din Daeng campaign.

Death and legacy

King Rama I died on 7 September 1809 after a short but acute illness; he was succeeded by his son Prince Isarasundhorn as Buddha Loetla Nabhalai or Rama II.

Siam during the reign of Rama I reached a new height of power not seen since the sixteenth century. Militarily Siam was able to successfully repel Burmese invasions and exerted control over Laos and Cambodia and Vietnam. Culturally Rama I also encouraged cultural works to rehabilitate people after the successive series of wars and built many temples and monuments during his reign. His policies laid the foundation for Siam to expand within the next decades.

Ancestry

In memoriam
 "Chakri Memorial Day", a public holiday, is celebrated on 6 April, observed to commemorate the founder of the Chakri dynasty.
 A statue of Rama I in front of the Memorial Bridge (Phra Phutthayotfa Memorial Bridge).
 The 500 baht banknote, Series 16, issued in 2014, depicts images of the King Rama I monument, Wat Phra Chetuphon Vimolmangklararm Rajwaramahaviharn (Wat Pho), and Phra Sumen Fort on its back side.

See also

 
 List of people with the most children

References

Rama 01
1737 births
1809 deaths
18th-century Chakri dynasty
19th-century Chakri dynasty
18th-century Thai monarchs
19th-century Thai monarchs
Rama 01
1782 murders in Asia
Regicides
Founding monarchs
1782 establishments in Siam
Thai people of Mon descent
Thai people of Chinese descent
People from Phra Nakhon Si Ayutthaya province
1780s in Siam
1790s in Siam
1800s in Siam
18th-century monarchs in Asia
19th-century monarchs in Asia
18th-century Thai people
19th-century Thai people
Samuhanayok
City founders